Erick Rodríguez may refer to:

Erick Rodríguez (footballer) (born 1968), Costa Rican footballer
Erick Mauricio Rodríguez (born 1968), Honduran lawyer and politician
Erick Rodríguez Steller (born 1969), Costa Rican politician
Erick Rodríguez (runner) (born 1990), Nicaraguan middle distance runner

See also
Eric Rodriguez (disambiguation)